Sulpan is a rural locality (a village) in Kysylsky Selsoviet, Alsheyevsky District, Bashkortostan, Russia. The population was 117 as of 2010. There are 5 streets.

Geography 
Sulpan is located 53 km southeast of Rayevsky (the district's administrative centre) by road. Tavrichanka is the nearest rural locality.

References 

Rural localities in Alsheyevsky District